Seleucus III Soter, called Seleucus Ceraunus (c. 243 BC – April/June 223 BC, ruled December 225 – April/June 223 BC), was a ruler of the Hellenistic Seleucid Kingdom, the eldest son of Seleucus II Callinicus and Laodice II.

Biography
His birth name was Alexander and he was named after his great uncle the Seleucid official Alexander. Alexander changed his name to Seleucus after he succeeded his father as King. After a brief reign of less than two years (225–223 BC), during which he unsuccessfully continued his father's war in Asia Minor against Attalus I of Pergamon of Pergamum, Seleucus was assassinated in Anatolia by members of his army. His official byname Soter means "Saviour", while his nickname Ceraunus means "Thunderbolt".

References

240s BC births
223 BC deaths
Year of birth uncertain
3rd-century BC Babylonian kings
3rd-century BC Seleucid rulers
Seleucid rulers
3rd-century BC murdered monarchs
3rd-century BC rulers